Uruvam is a 1991 Indian Tamil-language horror film, directed by G. M. Kumar. The film stars Mohan, Pallavi, R. P. Viswam, débutante Veera Pandiyan and Jaimala . It was released on 15 March 1991.

Plot 

The illegitimate son of a rich man loses a court battle over the palatial house in which he has been living. So he appeals to Bangaru Muni (Sathyajith) and he sets off a devastating abhichara prayoga (black magic attack) on the legitimate son Mohan (Mohan) and his family. Bangaru Muni unleashes dakini, sakini, Mohini pisachi and other pretas in house. He does the ashtadig bandhan so that person should not escape.

Mohan lives happily with his wife (Jaimala), his two children, his sister Raasi (Pallavi), his brother-in-law Ashok (Veera Pandiyan) and his wife's sister Meena (Roshini). They all move to the palatial house. Mohan is an atheist who doesn't believe in the supernatural or God. Soon, the family is disturbed by a supernatural spirit unleashed by Bangaru Muni. The spirit in Mohan's body kills his wife, his children and his brother-in-law and even Bangaru Muni. Finally, Jolna Swamy (R. P. Viswam) comes to their rescue and fights against the evil spirit which is in Mohan's body. Jolna Swamy finally destroys the spirit, but Mohan is sent to a mental asylum, where he grieves for not believing in Almighty God.

Cast 

Mohan as Mohan
Pallavi as Raasi
R. P. Viswam as Jolna Swamy
Veera Pandiyan as Ashok
Jayamala as Mohan's wife
Sathyajith as Bangaru Muni
Moorthy
Roshini as Meena
Master Krishnaprasad as Mohan's son
Baby Swarnalatha as Mohan's daughter
Crazy Venkatesh as Venkatesh
Vaithyanathan
R. T. Madurai Mani
Sottai Mani
Pandian

Production

Development 
After the failure of his films Pick Pocket and Irumbu Pookkal, G. M. Kumar began work on his next film, also his first horror film. The film was produced by actress Pallavi's brother and another partner.

Casting 
Mohan accepted the offer of the protagonist and hoped for a fresh lease on his career. Pallavi signed on for this new project with G. M. Kumar, who acted in two of his previous films. R. P. Viswam would have a vital role of a Swamy and was also responsible for the dialogue. The newcomer Arasavarathan would essay the role as Pallavi's husband, while Jayamala would play Mohan's wife. Three different cinematographers: K. Rajpreeth, Ilavarasan and Dhayal handle the camera, K. A. Balan was signed up as the art director, while A. P. Manivannan took up the post of the editor.

Filming 
The film was made on low budget, G. M. Kumar shot the film with three different units, each unit consisting of an assistant director and a cinematographer: S. Govindaraj with K. Rajpreeth, S. Selvakumar with Ilavarasan and D. Narayanamoorthy with Dhayal. G. M. Kumar managed to complete the film within 12 days. The film did not include any fight sequences. Ilaiyaraaja provided mainly the background music and composed only one song. The film was heavily censored by the censor board, which gave the film an "A" certificate, an adult rating, due to its "mix of soft porn and hard horror".

References

External links 

1990s Tamil-language films
1991 films
1991 horror films
Censored films
Films directed by G. M. Kumar
Films scored by Ilaiyaraaja
Indian horror films